Volostnovka is a rural locality (a selo) in Volostnovsky Selsoviet, Kugarchinsky District, Bashkortostan, Russia. The population was 423 as of 2010. There are 5 streets.

Geography 
Volostnovka is located 33 km northwest of Mrakovo (the district's administrative centre) by road. Kaldarovo is the nearest rural locality.

References 

Rural localities in Kugarchinsky District